Going Steady is a 1958 American comedy romance film directed by Fred F. Sears and starring Molly Bee and Alan Reed Jr.

Plot
Julie Ann Turner, 17, wants to travel by car with friends Olive and Woody from her Pasadena, California home to Reno, Nevada, where her boyfriend Calvin Potter will be participating in a basketball game. Her mom Grace talks her opposed dad Gordon into letting her go.

Calvin makes a game-winning shot. Everyone celebrates afterward, and Julie Ann, in her excitement, suggests to Calvin that they elope, just as her Aunt Lola did at that age. Calvin agrees, but they decide to keep the wedding secret for a while when they get home.

As time goes by, Julie Ann asks friend Olive to accompany her to see an obstetrician. Rumor spreads that Olive is expecting a baby, so Julie Ann admits it's actually her. When the news is broken to her parents, it comes as news to Calvin, too. He moves in with the Turners, accepted by mother-in-law Grace but infuriating father-in-law Gordon, whose demand that the marriage be annulled is rejected with Julie being pregnant.

Calvin quarrels with his bride and reluctantly takes a job in her dad's hardware store. Aunt Lola arrives in time for Julie Ann's graduation day and turns out to be helpful as Grace finally persuades Gordon to give the kids his blessing in beginning their new lives.

Cast
 Molly Bee as Julie Ann Turner Potter 
 Alan Reed Jr. as Calvin Potter 
 Bill Goodwin as Gordon P. Turner 
 Irene Hervey as Grace Turner 
 Ken Miller as Woody Simmons 
 Susan Easter as Olive Nelson 
 Linda Watkins as Aunt Lola 
 Byron Foulger as Mr. George Potter
 Hugh Sanders as Mr. Ahern
 Florence Ravenel as Mrs. Potter
 Ralph Moody as Justice of the Peace

See also
 List of American films of 1958

References

External links
 
 Going Steady at TCMDB
 
 
 Review of film at Variety

1958 films
American teen comedy films
Columbia Pictures films
1958 comedy films
American high school films
1950s teen films
Films directed by Fred F. Sears
1950s English-language films
1950s American films